Skyttorp is a locality situated in Uppsala Municipality, Uppsala County, Sweden with 632 inhabitants in 2018.

Transportation 

Skyttorp is part of the Upptåget-traffic between Gävle northward and Uppsala southward. Travel time is 17 minutes to Uppsala and 53 minutes to Gävle.

There is also UL-buss 823 connecting Skyttorp with Österbybruk and Uppsala.

Demographics

References 

Populated places in Uppsala County
Populated places in Uppsala Municipality